The de Havilland Firestreak is a British first-generation, passive infrared homing (heat seeking) air-to-air missile. It was developed by de Havilland Propellers (later Hawker Siddeley) in the early 1950s, entering service in 1957. It was the first such weapon to enter active service with the Royal Air Force (RAF) and Fleet Air Arm, equipping the English Electric Lightning, de Havilland Sea Vixen and Gloster Javelin. It was a rear-aspect, fire and forget pursuit weapon, with a field of attack of 20 degrees either side of the target.

Developed under the rainbow code "Blue Jay", Firestreak was the third heat-seeking missile to enter service, after the US AIM-4 Falcon and AIM-9 Sidewinder, both of which entered service the previous year. In comparison to those designs, the Firestreak was larger and almost twice as heavy, carrying a much larger warhead. It had otherwise similar performance in terms of speed and range. It was also a very complex system, with an unusual internal design, requiring the launch aircraft to provide both cooling for its tube-based electronics and heating to prevent various moving parts from freezing prior to launch.

An improved version, "Blue Vesta", was developed as part of the Operational Requirement F.155 project but ended when that project was canceled in 1957. Development restarted as a somewhat simpler version for the Lightning which was given the name "Red Top". This featured transistorized electronics and greatly simplified internal design. Keeping its code name, it entered service on Lightning and Sea Vixen as the Hawker Siddeley Red Top. Red Top could not be carried on early versions of the Lightning, and so Firestreak remained in service until 1988, when the last RAF Lightnings retired.

Development

Red Hawk
Firestreak was the result of a series of projects begun with the OR.1056 Red Hawk missile, which called for an all-aspect seeker that could attack a target from any launch position. When this proved too ambitious for the state of the art, another specification lacking the all-aspect requirement was released as Blue Sky, which briefly entered service as Fireflash the year before Firestreak.

Blue Jay
In 1951 the Royal Aircraft Establishment (RAE), in charge of missile development, felt that infrared seeking had progressed to the point of reconsidering the Red Hawk requirement. This too turned out to be too demanding for the seekers of the era, although a more limited tail-aspect design was clearly possible in the short term. This led to another lower-performance specification that was released in 1951 as OR.1117, and given the Ministry of Supply rainbow codename Blue Jay.

Blue Jay developed as a fairly conventional-looking missile with cropped delta wings mounted just aft of the midpoint and small rectangular control surfaces in tandem towards the rear. Internally, things were considerably more complex. The tube-based electronics took up most of the forward quarter of the fuselage, leaving little room for a warhead. This led to the warhead being moved to the rear of the fuselage where it was wrapped around the rocket nozzle. That left no room for the actuators for the rear-mounted control fins, which were instead operated by nose-mounted actuators via long pushrods. The actuators were powered by compressed air from bottles at the extreme rear, fed forward through long pipes. The air bottles also powered a turbo-alternator for electrical power after launch. In the case of a miss, the missile self-destructed when the alternator slowed down after the air ran out.

The Magpie rocket motor took up only a small portion of the missile fuselage, placed between the actuators and the warhead, roughly centred under the mid-mounted wings.

The unusual faceted nose was chosen when a more conventional hemispherical nose proved prone to ice accretion. The seeker was cooled by running filtered air through an ammonia-cooled heat exchanger.

There were two rows of triangular windows in bands around the forward fuselage, behind which sat the optical proximity fuzes for the warhead. The prodigious  warhead had a  lethal radius and was triggered either by the proximity fuzes or four contact fuses set on the front of the wings. The outer casing of the warhead was designed to fragment into  pieces fired forward in a 50 degree cone.

The electronics, made from vacuum tubes, generated significant heat. For this reason, the Firestreak missile undergoing a ground test was cooled by Arcton, and in-flight by ammonia pumped through the missile from bottles in the rear of the launching "shoe". The bottles contained enough ammonia for 15 minutes, so the missile could only be started up during the approach. An air bottle in the fuselage-mounted weapon pack kept the ammonia bottles pressurized before launch. Hot air from the engine compressor stages connected to the rear of the launch pack and was routed to the missiles. During flight, this kept various moving components warm, warm enough that they would not freeze up during the 13 second flight time.

Service

The first airborne launch of Blue Jay took place in 1954 from a de Havilland Venom, the target drone - a Fairey Firefly - being destroyed. Blue Jay Mk.1 entered service in 1957 with the RAF, where it was named Firestreak. Firestreak was deployed by the Royal Navy and the RAF in August 1958; it was the first effective British air-to-air missile.

For launch, the missile seeker was slaved to the launch aircraft's radar (Ferranti AIRPASS in the Lightning and GEC AI.18 in the Sea Vixen) until lock was achieved and the weapon was launched, leaving the interceptor free to acquire another target. A downside was that the missile was highly toxic (due to either the Magpie rocket motor or the ammonia coolant) and RAF armourers had to wear some form of CRBN protection to safely mount the missile onto an aircraft. "Unlike modern [1990s] missiles, ... Firestreak could only be fired outside cloud, and in winter, skies were rarely clear over the UK."

Improvements
Two minor Blue Jay variants were studied but not adopted. The Blue Jay Mk.2 included the more powerful Magpie II motor and a PbTe seeker which offered better detection capabilities. Blue Jay Mk.3 had an increased wingspan and reduced performance motor. The derated motor was intended to limit acceleration when launched from supersonic rocket-powered interceptors such as the Saunders-Roe SR.177 and Avro 720, where the additional speed imparted by the Magpie II would have given it a maximum speed so high it would suffer from adverse aerodynamic heating.

Looking for an improved weapon for the Operational Requirement F.155 interceptors, in 1955 the Air Ministry issued OR.1131 for an all-aspect design capability against enemy aircraft traveling at Mach 2. De Havilland responded with Blue Jay Mk.4, which was later given its own rainbow code, Blue Vesta. This adopted the PbTe seeker of Mk.2, further improved by cooling it to improve its sensitivity in what became known as the "Violet Banner" seeker. The motor was further upgraded to the new Magpie III. To handle the aerodynamic heating issues, the fins were made of steel rather than aluminum, and featured cut-away sections to keep the rear portions of the surfaces out of the Mach cones, a feature they referred to as "mach tips". Work on Mk.4 was curtailed after 1956 as the RAE decided that the closing speeds of two Mach 2+ aircraft would be so rapid that the missile would have no chance to be launched while still within the range of its seeker.

In August 1956, the Fleet Air Arm took over development of the Blue Jay line with Blue Jay Mk.5, replacing the IR seeker with a semi-active radar homing (SARH) system intended to be used with the De Havilland Sea Vixen's AI.18 radar with a special continual wave illuminator mode. This was otherwise identical to Mk.4, differing only by replacing its seeker section with a longer ogive nose cone holding the radar receiver antenna. Problems fitting the illuminator antenna to the Sea Vixen ended work on this project. In November 1957 it was briefly restarted under the name Blue Dolphin as other radar-guided developments ended, but this was never deployed.

Red Top

After the fallout of the 1957 Defence White Paper led to the cancellation of the F.155 and many other interceptor projects, the English Electric Lightning was allowed to continue largely because development was almost complete. This left it with no modern weapon, so Blue Vesta was reactivated in a slightly modified form. In November 1957, paperwork with the Blue Vesta name on it was considered disclosed and the project was assigned the new name "Red Top".

In contrast to the Mk.4 there were several important changes. The adoption of transistorized circuits in place of the former thermionic valves eliminated the need for cooling the electronics, as well as making the guidance section significantly smaller. This allowed the warhead to be moved from its former position near the tail to the midsection, which also allowed it to grow in size and weight, replacing the former blast-fragmentation type with an expanding-rod system that was significantly deadlier. The rear section of the missile was now left empty, allowing the fin actuators to be moved there, removing the complex routing.

Given the elimination of the ammonia cooling, which was also used by the Violet Banner seeker of the Mk.4, the decision was made to use a simplified seeker that did not require cooling to the same level. This led to a new indium antimonide (InSb) design that was cooled with purified air at  filtered to 3 μm. This reduced its sensitivity compared to Violet Banner, lacking its true all-aspect ability, but further simplified the design and eliminated ground handling concerns.

Never given its own name by the RAF, the new design entered service in 1964 as Red Top. It was faster and had a longer range than Firestreak, and "was capable of all aspect homing against super-sonic targets." Despite Red Top being intended to replace Firestreak, Firestreak remained in limited service until the final retirement of the Lightning in 1988; carrying Red Top required more vertical tail to stabilize the effects of the missile's larger wings, so Firestreak remained in use on older models of the Lightning.

Operators

Past operators
 
 Kuwait Air Force
 
 Royal Saudi Air Force
 
 Royal Air Force
 Royal Navy, Fleet Air Arm

Notes

References

Citations

Bibliography

External links

 The de Havilland Firestreak
 The Jet Age Museum - exhibits one

Cold War air-to-air missiles of the United Kingdom
Firestreak
Military equipment introduced in the 1950s
Fire-and-forget weapons
De Havilland